Prisoners of the Sun is a 2013 British-French adventure horror film directed by Roger Christian starring John Rhys-Davies, David Charvet, Carmen Chaplin, Emily Holmes, Nick Moran, Joss Ackland, Michael Higgs, Gulshan Grover and Shane Richie.

Plot 

A young archaeological apprentice named Doug Adler (David Charvet) is dragged into a perilous expedition deep beneath the timeless sands of Egypt. He and a group of others encounter ancient monsters and escape death traps, but through the expedition, they discover a secret older than time and a danger beyond imagination. However, the "sleepers" have awoken, the gods have risen and the countdown to the end of the world has begun. The Voyagers must find a way to stop the mummy named Al Khem Ayut (Cedric Proust) and escape from the pyramid before time runs out.

Cast

Release
The film was released on DVD by Phase 4 Films on 8 July 2014.

References

External links

Miromar Entertainment AG
LUXX STUDIOS

2013 films
2010s adventure films
2010s monster movies
Ancient Egypt in fiction
Films set in Egypt
2013 horror films
Films directed by Roger Christian
British horror films
French horror films
Mummy films
2010s English-language films
2010s British films
2010s French films